Helen Mary Slatter (born 7 June 1970) is an English former swimmer.

Swimming career
Born in King's Lynn, Norfolk, she represented Great Britain at the Olympic Games in 1988, 1992 and 1996, Her international results include finishing 11th in the 200m backstroke at the 1991 World Championships and 13th in the 100m backstroke at the 1996 Olympic Games.

She represented England in the 100 metres backstroke, at the 1990 Commonwealth Games in Auckland, New Zealand. Four years later she competed five events in the backstroke, butterfly and individual medley events, at the 1994 Commonwealth Games and made a third appearance at the 1998 Commonwealth Games when competing in the 100 metres backstroke event.

She won the 1994 ASA National British Championships title in the 200 metres butterfly and the 1992 and 1994 ASA National Championship title in the 400 metres medley.

International competitions

References

1970 births
Living people
English female swimmers
Olympic swimmers of Great Britain
Swimmers at the 1988 Summer Olympics
Swimmers at the 1992 Summer Olympics
Swimmers at the 1996 Summer Olympics
Sportspeople from King's Lynn
Swimmers at the 1990 Commonwealth Games
Swimmers at the 1994 Commonwealth Games
Swimmers at the 1998 Commonwealth Games
Commonwealth Games competitors for England
20th-century English women
21st-century English women